The Alice Abel Arboretum is a 25 acres (10 hectares) arboretum located at 5000 St. Paul Street on the campus of Nebraska Wesleyan University in Lincoln, Nebraska.

Exhibits
The Arboretum includes over 100 species of trees, shrubs and herbaceous plants. Its woody plants include: 

  Abies concolor
  Acer campestre
  Acer ginnala
  Acer rubrum
  Acer saccharinum
  Acer saccharum
  Aesculus hippocastanum
  Betula papyrifera
  Catalpa speciosa
  Celtis occidentalis
  Cercis canadensis
  Cornus alba 'Argenteomarginata'
  Crataegus crus-galli
  Euonymus alatus 'Compactus'
  Fraxinus americana 'Autumn Purple'
  Fraxinus pennsylvanica
  Ginkgo biloba
  Gymnocladus dioicus
  Juniperus virginiana
  Juniperus virginiana 'Taylor'
  Magnolia soulangiana
  Malus spp.
  Phellodendron amurense
  Picea abies
  Picea pungens 'Glauca'
  Pinus mugo
  Pinus nigra
  Pinus ponderosa
  Pinus strobus
  Pinus sylvestris
  Platanus occidentalis
  Populus deltoides
  Prunus padus
  Pseudotsuga menziesii
  Quercus bicolor
  Quercus macrocarpa
  Quercus palustris
  Quercus robur
  Quercus rubra
  Rhus spp.
  Spiraea spp.
  Syringa spp.
  Taxodium distichum
  Taxus cuspidata
  Tilia euchlora
  Ulmus americana
  Viburnum lentago

See also
 List of botanical gardens in the United States

External links

Botanical gardens in Nebraska
Arboreta in Nebraska
Geography of Lincoln, Nebraska
Protected areas of Lancaster County, Nebraska
Tourist attractions in Lincoln, Nebraska